The Mount Alexander Shire (officially Shire of Mount Alexander) is a local government area in Victoria, Australia, located in the central part of the state. It includes the towns of Castlemaine, Chewton, Elphinstone, Maldon, Newstead, Harcourt, Taradale, Vaughan, Fryerstown and Campbells Creek. It was formed in 1995 from the amalgamation of the City of Castlemaine, Shire of Newstead, and most of the Shire of Maldon and Shire of Metcalfe. The traditional owners of the land are Dja Dja Wurrung.

The Shire is governed and administered by the Mount Alexander Shire Council; its seat of local government and administrative centre is located at the council headquarters in Castlemaine, it also has service centres located in Maldon and Newstead. The Shire is named after the first European settlers name for the Castlemaine region and goldfields.

Council

Current composition
The council is composed of five wards and seven councillors, with three councillors elected to represent the Castlemaine Ward and one councillor per remaining ward elected to represent each of the other wards.

Administration and governance
The council meets in the council chambers at the council headquarters in the Castlemaine Municipal Offices, which is also the location of the council's administrative activities. It also provides customer services at both its administrative centre in Castlemaine, and its service centres in Maldon and Newstead.

Townships and localities
The 2021 census, the shire had a population of 20,253 up from 18,761 in the 2016 census

^ - Territory divided with another LGA

See also
List of localities (Victoria)

References

External links 

 Mount Alexander Shire Council official website
 Metlink local public transport map 
 Link to Land Victoria interactive maps

Local government areas of Victoria (Australia)
Loddon Mallee (region)
 
North Central Victoria